Knud Olaf Holm (2 January 1887 – 28 May 1972) was a Danish gymnast who competed in the 1906 Summer Olympics and in the 1908 Summer Olympics.

At the 1906 Summer Olympics in Athens, he was a member of the Danish gymnastics team, which won the silver medal in the team, Swedish system event. Two years later he was part of the Danish team, which finished fourth in the team competition.

References

1887 births
1972 deaths
Danish male artistic gymnasts
Gymnasts at the 1906 Intercalated Games
Gymnasts at the 1908 Summer Olympics
Olympic gymnasts of Denmark
Olympic silver medalists for Denmark
Medalists at the 1906 Intercalated Games